Barron G. Collier High School is a four-year public high school located in North Naples, Collier County, Florida, United States, near Pine Ridge and about  northeast of the city of Naples.

Barron Collier was included in Newsweeks 2006 list of top U.S. high schools by Jay Mathews's Challenge Index.

History
The school was opened in 1978 and is named after Barron Collier, an entrepreneur who founded Collier County.

Athletics
Barron Collier High School is one of the seven members of the Collier County Athletic Conference. The school's official list of sports is separated by season. In 2012 and 2013, both the men and women's tennis teams won the state title. In 2006 and 2008, the Cougar Varsity Girls Basketball team won the Class 5A state championship. The main athletic crosstown rivals are Naples High School, Lely High School, and Gulf Coast High School.

Fall sports
 Football
 Golf
 Boys and Girls Cross Country
 Swimming and Diving
 Girls Volleyball

Winter sports
 Boys Basketball
 Girls Basketball
 Boys Soccer
 Girls Soccer
 Wrestling
 Bowling
 Girls Weightlifting

Spring sports
 Boys Baseball
 Boys Lacrosse
 Girls Lacrosse
 Softball
 Tennis
 Track and Field

Extra-curricular activities

Choirs
 Concert Chorus
 Bel Canto 
 Vocal Ensemble
 Glee
 Men's Choir
 Honor Choir

Bands
 Marching Band
 (Drum line, weapon line, flag line and dance team)
 Wind Ensemble
 Symphonic Band
 Concert Band
 Jazz Band
 Winter Guard - Weapon Line and Flag Line
 Dance Team/Dance Line

Orchestra
 String Orchestra
 Chamber Orchestra

Clubs
The school is home to several extracurricular clubs. An accurate, up-to-date list is difficult to keep, as clubs are added and dropped as students graduate or lose interest. However, some of the notable clubs are:
 JROTC (including Drill Team, Raiders Team, Rifle Team, Color Guard, Honor Guard)
 DECA
 Key Club
 Model United Nations
 National Honor Society
 Spanish Honor Society
 Drama Club
 Art Club

Recognition
 Ranked as an 'A' school based on FCAT scores
 Boys Tennis State Champions: 2010, 2011, 2012, and 2013
 Girls Basketball State Champions: 2006 and 2008
 Wrestling State Champions: 1994
 Football District Champions: 1990, 1995, 2007, 2008, 2009
 Basketball District Champions: 1999, 2011

Alumni
 Haley Bennett, actress
Adam Botana, member of the Florida House of Representatives
Bjorn Fratangelo, professional tennis player
 David Grutman, Miami-based nightclub and restaurant owner, and mogul 
 Courtney Hansen, actress, television personality, syndicated columnist, and model
 Anthony Herrera, NFL offensive guard
 Jeff Heuerman, Denver Broncos tight end
Lauren Melo, businesswoman and politician
 Chris Resop, Major League Baseball pitcher
 Jonathan Isaac, Orlando Magic, NBA

Images

References

High schools in Collier County, Florida
Public high schools in Florida
Educational institutions established in 1978
1978 establishments in Florida